Martina Gmür (born 1979) is a Swiss visual artist. She works within many genres, including installation art, painting, drawing, performance art, and sculpture. She lives in Basel.

Early life and education 

Martina Gmür was born on 6 August 1979 in Münster, Valais, Switzerland (now Goms, Valais).

Career 
In 2007, she was awarded the Manor Cultural Prize for the Canton of Valais; and in 2000, she was awarded the UBS Art Award, by the UBS Culture Foundation and funded by the investment bank UBS. 

References 

1979 births
Living people
Swiss women artists
20th-century Swiss women artists
Swiss installation artists
Artists from Basel-Stadt
People from Goms District